Maurice Wilson was a Scottish amateur football wing half who appeared in the Scottish League for Queen's Park.

Personal life 
Wilson served as a sergeant in the Royal Field Artillery during the First World War.

Career statistics

References

Year of birth missing
Scottish footballers
Scottish Football League players
British Army personnel of World War I
Association football wing halves
Queen's Park F.C. players
Royal Field Artillery soldiers
Place of death missing
Place of birth missing
Year of death missing